Omalocephala intermedia is a species of lantern flies belonging to the family Fulgoridae.

Distribution
This species can be found in Tanzania and Eritrea.

References

 Bolivar I. & Chicote D. C. (1879) Enumeracion de los Hemipteros observados en Espana y Portugal, Anales de la Sociedad Espanola de Historia Natural. Madrid, 8: 147-186

Hemiptera of Africa
Aphaeninae